Hermes Records is an independent record label founded in Tehran, Iran, in 1999 by Ramin Sadighi. Under the slogan music for music, Hermes has published and produced mainly contemporary Persian music.

Hermes Records has published different styles and genres of contemporary Persian music, as well as interactions between western and oriental musical textures and harmonies. It has been described as having "almost singlehandedly built a much needed platform for artists and fans of genuinely experimental Iranian music".

The label is officially distributed in Iran, Turkey, Italy, UK, France, Germany, Greece & BeNeLux, but via second-party businesses, some recordings can also be found in other countries. Their music is also available online at Mondomix, Amazon, iTunes, Rhapsody, AOL and MusicMatch.

Genres

From the beginning, Ramin Sadighi (CEO of Hermes Records) has produced widely different styles of contemporary Persian musicians. The label does not produce strictly classical Persian music and pop music, as they have their own labels, and vocal music by women is censored by the government of contemporary Iran. In the catalogue, there are examples of World Music, Jazz, Avant Garde, Contemporary, Western Classical, Minimal, Electro-Acoustic, Fusion, Rock, Folk and sound tracks for films.

In a 2009 article for MERIP, Sadighi and Mahdavi described the evolution of the post-revolutionary music scene in Iran, its subversive character, and Western misconceptions of underground and rock music in Iran.

Selection of musicians 
Ahmad Pejman, Mohammadreza Aligholi
Alireza Mashayekhi, Hossein Alizadeh, Dušan Bogdanović, Farokhzad Layegh, Soheil Nafisi, Amir Eslami, Peyman Yazdanian, Ali Boustan, Pejman Hadadi, Kiawasch Saheb Nassagh, Mehrdad Pakbaz, Morteza Sa'edi, Hooshyar Khayam, Nima A Rowshan, Ardavan Vossoughi, Sahba Aminikia, Golfam Khayam, Quartet Diminished

Awards and nominations
 2006: Label of the year at Fajr International Music Festival
 2007: Grammy Awards – Endless Vision by Hossein Alizadeh, Jivan Gasparyan – nominated
 2015: Womex Award for Professional Excellence

References

Further reading 

 Moazami M. (2021) Tehran, Iran: Experimental’ Electronic Scene (2000–2020). In: Darchen S., Charrieras D., Willsteed J. (eds) Electronic Cities. Palgrave Macmillan, Singapore. https://doi.org/10.1007/978-981-33-4741-0_16

External links 

 
 Video on the occasion of 22 years of Hermes Records
 Hermes Records YouTube channel
 Hermes Records on Discogs
 Herms Records on classical next
 Q & A with Ramin Sadighi the founder of Hermes Records. by Spencer Grady, Record Collector, March 2010[dead link]
 Interview with Ramin Sadighi (article in Italian) Thursday, 29 November 2007[dead link]

Persian music
Iranian record labels